Iowa Highway 14 (Iowa 14) is a state highway that runs from north to south across the state of Iowa for . The begins in Corydon at an intersection with Iowa 2 and ends in Charles City at an intersection with U.S. Highway 18 (US 18) and US 218 Business.

Route description
Iowa Highway 14 begins in Corydon at Iowa 2.  It goes north past Millerton and intersects US 34 in Chariton.  After leaving Chariton going north, it turns northeast near Williamson, then turns north shortly before intersecting Iowa 5 and Iowa 92 at Knoxville.  In Knoxville, the road passes east of Knoxville Raceway and the National Sprint Car Hall of Fame & Museum. It continues north past the locally famous "Mile Long Bridge", which carries the highway across Lake Red Rock, and then intersects Iowa 163 in Monroe.  It proceeds north to Newton, where it intersects Interstate 80 and a short overlap with US 6 begins.  The overlap ends as it skirts the eastern edge of Lambs Grove.  It continues north, then turns east and turns north again when it intersects Iowa 224.  It continues north through Laurel, then intersects US 30 at the southern edge of Marshalltown.

Iowa 14 then goes through Marshalltown and then intersects Iowa 330 and Iowa 96 before intersecting Iowa 175 west of Grundy Center.  Iowa 14 and Iowa 175 then overlap into Grundy Center.  Iowa 14 turns north at Grundy Center and intersects U.S. Highway 20 before meeting Iowa 57 near Parkersburg.  They overlap through Parkersburg, then Iowa 14 turns north.  It continues north until Iowa 3, with which it overlaps for one mile (1.6 km) near Allison.  It continues north west of Allison through Greene, goes through Roseville, then turns east towards Charles City.  West of Charles City, it intersects US 18, US 218, and Iowa 27, the Iowa designation for the Avenue of the Saints.  It continues east into downtown Charles City and ends at another intersection with US 18.

History
Iowa Highway 14 was established July 1, 1920, when the Iowa highway system was established.  On May 1, 2006, Iowa 14 was extended further into Charles City to intersect US 18, which was rerouted around Charles City that day.

Major intersections

References

014
Transportation in Wayne County, Iowa
Transportation in Lucas County, Iowa
Transportation in Marion County, Iowa
Transportation in Jasper County, Iowa
Transportation in Marshall County, Iowa
Transportation in Grundy County, Iowa
Transportation in Floyd County, Iowa